The girl next door is a young female stock character who is often used in romantic stories. She is so named because she often lives next door to the protagonist or is a childhood friend. They start out with a mutual friendship that later often develops into romantic attraction.

A similar expression is "boy next door".

Characteristics 
A "girl next door" character is often seen as natural and unpretentious. A trope that evokes nostalgia, it is associated with small towns and more local or even rural ways of life. The girl next door is often portrayed as innocent.

Doris Day of the 1950s is described as a pioneering embodiment of the "girl next door" image in film, the "Hollywood's girl next door".

A common cliche is when a male protagonist is caught in a love triangle between two women, he will usually choose the "sweet, ordinary, and caring girl next door" he grew up with rather than a more well-off or beautiful woman with fewer morals. Other times, this character ignores the hero for another male character, despite being the object of his affections.

The character Mary Ann Summers from the TV show Gilligan's Island (portrayed by Dawn Wells) had the girl next door allure, in a contrast with the more glamorous character Ginger Grant (portrayed by Tina Louise). Due to the popularity of the show and the two lead female characters, the question "Ginger or Mary Ann?" became shorthand for asking someone whether they preferred a girl next door type or a more glamorous type.

See also 

 Farmer's daughter
Friend zone
 Innamorati

References

Further reading
 
From a review: "To Michal Levine and Steven Jay Schneider ... Buffy is just another unconscious Freudian reality tale starring the proverbial girl next door."  in: Joss Whedon: The Complete Companion: The TV Series, the Movies, the Comic Books, and More
 
The article criticizes Sports Illustrated for their misuse of term "girl next door": "Otherwise the magazine is still pushing what Ms. Brinkley repeatedly described as the "natural beauty" of "what readers long for – the girl next door". Who is the girl next door? Her fake name keeps changing but she is still the same empty-headed, smiling, air-brushed mannequin who appeared in Playboy in the 1950s and early 60s..."

Stereotypes of women
Female stock characters